Edinburgh South by-election may refer to:

 1886 Edinburgh South by-elections
 1899 Edinburgh South by-election
 1909 Edinburgh South by-election
 1910 Edinburgh South by-election
 1917 Edinburgh South by-election
 1920 Edinburgh South by-election
 1957 Edinburgh South by-election